Aphaenogaster picea is a species of ant in the family Formicidae.

Subspecies
These two subspecies belong to the species Aphaenogaster picea:
 Aphaenogaster picea picea (Wheeler, 1908) i c g
 Aphaenogaster picea rudis Enzmann, 1947 i c g
Data sources: i = ITIS, c = Catalogue of Life, g = GBIF, b = Bugguide.net

References

Further reading

External links

 

picea
Articles created by Qbugbot
Insects described in 1908